Kieran Ewan Freeman (born 20 March 2000) is a Scottish professional footballer who plays as a right-back for Scottish Premiership club Dundee United.

Career

Club
A product of the Scottish Football Association's Performance School based at St John's Roman Catholic High School in Dundee, Freeman played for Dundee United at youth level before leaving in July 2016, aged 16, to sign his first professional contract with Premier League club Southampton. He suffered three serious injuries in his first two years at Southampton, but was offered a new short-term contract by the club at the end of the 2018–19 season.

Following the expiry of his Southampton contract, Freeman returned to Dundee United on trial in January 2020 and was subsequently offered a contract until the end of the 2019–20 season. In May 2020, he signed a two-year contract extension. He made his senior debut on 15 August 2020, in Dundee United's 2–1 Scottish Premiership win away to Ross County. Freeman joined Scottish League One club Peterhead on a season-long loan in September 2020, but after making 14 appearances his loan was cut short in January 2021 when the lower divisions were suspended due to the COVID-19 pandemic. He returned on loan to Peterhead in March 2021, after the suspension was lifted.

Freeman scored his first goal for Dundee United on 14 July 2021, in a 6–1 win over Elgin City in the Scottish League Cup. Given a run of regular starting appearances due to Liam Smith being out injured, he scored his first league goal in a 3-0 win over Hibernian at Easter Road in October 2021, and subsequently extended his contract by a further two years.

International
Freeman represented Scotland at under-15 and under-16 international level in 2014.  In 2022 he was called up to the under-21 squad for European Championship Qualifiers against Belgium and Denmark, playing in both games.

Career statistics

References

External links

2000 births
Living people
Footballers from Aberdeen
Scottish footballers
Scotland youth international footballers
Association football defenders
Dundee United F.C. players
Southampton F.C. players
Peterhead F.C. players
Scottish Professional Football League players
Scotland under-21 international footballers